Toby Gilmore ( 1742/4719 April 1812) was born in coastal West Africa as Shibodee Turrey Wurry, the son of a local chieftain. He was kidnapped at the age of sixteen by slave traders. Later he would regain his freedom by enlisting in the Continental Army during the American Revolution.

Early life
Around 1758, Shibodee Turrey Wurry was captured by slave traders while collecting coconuts, and placed in chains below deck aboard the slave ship Dove. This ship bound for Virginia had to change course because it was damaged during a storm, sailing to Rhode Island instead. There he was auctioned off and purchased by Captain (nautical, not military)  John Gilmore of Raynham Massachusetts.
According to local legend John and his wife had no children of their own and renamed Shibodee to Toby Gilmore, teaching him to read and write.
However this has proven to be untrue; the couple had several children, and it is unclear if Toby could read and write.

Revolutionary War
During the war, Toby was attached to military companies that served at Battle of Monmouth, Battle of Forts Clinton and Montgomery, Battle of White Plains, West Point, Siege of Fort Ticonderoga (1777) and the Winter at Valley Forge.

Toby began his service on 8 December 1776, as a Private in Capt. Jonathan Shaw's company, Col. George Williams's Regt. (3rd Bristol Co.) He served for eleven days. The company marched to Warren, RI, on an alarm. 4 November 1777, he joined Capt. James Cooper's company, Col. Gamaliel Bradfords's 12th Regt. After that his Continental Army pay records show he served from 19 September 1777, to 3 September 1780; he was enlisted for three years. In 1781 he served for two months and 24 days at North River (Hudson River). He was discharged from the army in December 1781 and returned home to Raynham. Afterwards he served during Shays' Rebellion his mitre was embroider with the a Federalist logo. Some of the records for him are missing local history/legend has linked him with Gen. George Washington.

Lore of George Washington

It is unknown whether or not Gilmore served under Gen. Washington. Local history of the Greater Taunton area states that Toby during the war rose in the ranks to the position of  "body guard " or "body servant" of George Washington. For his service he was awarded a cannon, that today resides at Old Colony Historical Society (OCHS) in Taunton, Massachusetts nicknamed "Old Toby". Every 4 July in celebration Toby would fire the cannon 14 times; 13 of these shots fired for the original Thirteen Colonies and the last shot would be fired to honor Gen. Washington.
Some have made claims that Toby is the African American pictured in Emanuel Gottlieb Leutze's 1851 oil painting Washington Crossing the Delaware. Popular belief today is that the figure was Prince Whipple; however, it is documented that Whipple and his master were in Baltimore at the time of the crossing. It may be that Leutze wanted to express that black patriots fought alongside their white counterparts during the Revolutionary War, and that the image of the soldier in the painting is not of anyone in particular but embodies all Black Patriots.

Freedom after the war
By the end of his service Toby was married to Rosanna Hack. They would go on to have eight children: Toby Jr., Nancy, Delia, Timothy, Esquire, Selina, Rosina, and Seabury. Toby returned and worked for his former master. Later he and his wife started their own housekeeping business. Toby was considered to be a frugal businessman and purchased forty-five acres and sixty rods of confiscated land in Raynham, Mass. The land was confiscated from a loyalist and auctioned off. Toby was so well liked in the area that very few prospectors bid against him.

The first house he built about 1784 still stands in Raynham. In 1798 he built his second homestead that was larger than his former master's home.

Toby died 19 April 1812, at the age of 70, according to his grave marker that still stands at Hall & Dean Cemetery in West Raynham.

Old Colony Historical Society

Most of the history of Tobias Gilmore can be found at OCHS where local historians are the keepers of some of his artifacts. These artifacts include his military mitre, "Old Toby" the canon, and his rundlet all on display. In the archives they have a military coat that was also donated by the Gilmore family. It is unclear exactly what period the coat comes from but it is unlikely that it was Toby's. It is speculated that it comes from one of his descendants and is a Civil War era coat.

The Taunton Daily Gazette on 24 October 1921, did a short article stating that Caroline J. Gilmore, the last member of the Gilmore line, had died that morning. It was believed that all of Toby's Gilmore descendants had died out. In the summer of 2010 OCHS staff along with one of the Gilmore descendants rediscovered the missing genealogical link. The article was printed on 20 October 2010 in the Taunton Daily Gazette.

In 2021 The Toby Gilmore Story, a play written by the playwright, actor Stephen Sampson and produced by Greater Joy Production, depicted scenes from Toby's life during the war. The play was performed at OCHS.

Sources

External links
http://www.enterprisenews.com/lifestyle/x788045982/Raynham-made-notable-contributions-during-wartime-over-the-course-of-U-S-history
http://www.tauntongazette.com/celebrations/x2030533563/New-research-African-born-Revolutionary-War-heros-bloodline-lives-on
http://www.wickedlocal.com/raynham/news/x414487711
http://www.mass.gov/?pageID=afterminal&L=5&L0=Home&L1=Research+%26+Technology&L2=Government+Data+%26+Documents&L3=State+Documents+%26+Resources&L4=State+Documents+Online&sid=Eoaf&b=terminalcontent&f=lib_ourorganization_
https://web.archive.org/web/20150629182333/http://www.slavevoyages.org/tast/database/search.faces
http://www.tauntongazette.com/news/x230258145/The-life-and-legend-of-freed-slave-from-Raynham-Toby-Gilmore?img=1

18th-century American slaves
Continental Army soldiers
African Americans in the American Revolution
Massachusetts militiamen in the American Revolution
People from Taunton, Massachusetts
Patriots in the American Revolution
Massachusetts Federalists
1740s births
1812 deaths
People from Raynham, Massachusetts
Year of birth uncertain
Black Patriots